Vypovo is a rural locality (a selo) in Pavlovskoye Rural Settlement, Suzdalsky District, Vladimir Oblast, Russia. The population was 67 as of 2010. There are 5 streets.

Geography 
Vypovo is located 18 km southwest of Suzdal (the district's administrative centre) by road. Tereneyevo is the nearest rural locality.

References 

Rural localities in Suzdalsky District